Angel Eyes is an EP by the American heavy metal band Riot, released on December 9, 1997, in Japan only, making it very collectible. It contains two songs from the recording sessions of the album Inishmore not available elsewhere, as well as "Turning the Hands of Time" which is not featured on the Japanese edition of Inishmore.

Track listing

Personnel

Band members
 Mike DiMeo - lead vocals, Hammond organ
 Mark Reale - electric lead and rhythm guitars, acoustic 6 and 12 string guitars, backing vocals, mandolin and Hammond organ, string arrangements, producer
 Mike Flyntz - electric lead and rhythm guitars
 Pete Perez - bass
 Bobby Jarzombek - drums

Additional musicians
 Tony Harnell, Danny Vaughn, Ligaya Perkins - backing vocals
 Kevin Dunne - strings, orchestration, engineer
 Yoko Kayumi - violin

Production
Paul Orofino - producer, engineer, mixing
Jeff Allen, Jack Bart - executive producers
Marius Perron, Bryan Scott - engineers
Jim Littleton - assistant engineer
Joseph M. Palmaccio - mastering

References

1997 EPs
Riot V albums